Oleg Łatyszonek (Aleh Latyshonak) (born  May 27, 1957 in Elbląg) is a historian from Białystok, Poland, of Belarusian ancestry. His interests and his Ph.D. are the research of early cultural identity of Belarusians and the building of the Belarusian nation.

Oleg Latyszonek was involved with the "Solidarity" political movement in 1980s and was imprisoned for assistance in publishing of illegal bulletins. In post-Communist Poland, Łatyszonek has been involved in setting up the Belarusian minority movement, the Association of Belarusians in Poland. He is one of the founders  of the Belarusian Historical Society, Poland.

Łatyszonek is the driving force of the "Radio Racja" ("Radio Reason") radio station that broadcasts from Bialystok in Belarusian language targeting the Belarusians in both in Poland and Belarus, as well as the Polish minority in Belarus.

In 2008 he was awarded the Knight's Cross of the Order of Polonia Restituta.

Works
 „Bialoruskie formacje wojskowe 1917-1923” ["Belarusian Military Units 1917-1923"], Bialystok, 1995,   (book review, in Belarusian)
 (With E. Mironowicz) „Historia Bialorusi od polowy XVIII do konca XX wieku” ["History of Belarus from the Mid-18th to the End of the 20th Century"], Bialystok, 2002  (book review, in Belarusian)
 "From White Rus to Belarus", in: Annus Albaruthenicus, no. 5, 2004.

References

1957 births
Living people
People from Elbląg
Polish people of Belarusian descent
20th-century Polish historians
Polish male non-fiction writers
Academic staff of the University of Białystok
21st-century Polish historians
Collaborators of the Polish Biographical Dictionary
Male non-fiction writers
Historians of Belarus
Recipient of the Meritorious Activist of Culture badge